The Atlantic Coast leopard frog (Lithobates kauffeldi) is a species of amphibian that is endemic to the United States. As a member of the genus Rana sensu lato, it is classified as a true frog, with typical smooth skin and a narrow waist. Its range stretches along the northern part of Eastern Seaboard, from Connecticut to North Carolina. The species takes its common name from the speckles on its legs and back reminiscent of a leopard pattern.

It is one of several species classified as leopard frogs, distinguished as unique through its mating call, genetic differences, habitat, and morphological distinctions.

Etymology
The Atlantic Coast leopard frog is one of several species of leopard frogs. Its species name, kauffeldi, is derived from the name of Staten Island herpetologist Carl Frederick Kauffeld, who in 1936 proposed that there could be a third species of leopard frog inhabiting the New York metropolitan area, specifically Staten Island. The author team that described the species in 2014 christened it after Kauffeld in honor of him.

Distribution and range
L. kauffeldi is found along the northeastern coast of the United States from central Connecticut to northeastern North Carolina. The north-south range is approximately 780 km long, and the width is about 100 km from the Atlantic shoreline inward. The range narrows as it progressed southward, mostly along the I-95 corridor. The species is thought to inhabit ten states, but the entirety of its distribution and range is not known. It is thought to be extirpated from most of western New York and Long Island.

The Atlantic Coast leopard frog is thought to be sympatric with both the northern leopard frog and the southern leopard frog in the northern and southern parts of its range, respectively. For a time the species remained undiscovered because of its similarity to both of the aforementioned in physical appearance and habitat.

A vector rendition of the range from Figure 1 of Feinberg et al. (2014) showing the range of the Atlantic Coast leopard frog side by side with the previously understood range for the northern and southern leopard frogs is shown here on Wikimedia Commons.

Characteristics
The frogs' coloring ranges from mint-gray to light olive green, and brown spots distribute irregularly across their backs and legs. Dark snout lines run along their heads. They have large eyes and strong legs used for leaping. Coloring has been observed to change between day and night as well as with the seasons, with many individuals taking nocturnal darker tones and diurnal lighter hues.

Adult males have large vocal sacs on either side of the head which are used to produce a mating call. This call is a single and distinct "chuck" sound rather than the repeated "ak-ak-ak" of related species.

Breeding
The species breeds at a similar time of year as many other leopard frog species. The frogs commence migrations in February and March. As the air temperature rises in March and April, males begin consistent nocturnal choruses of mating calls, though both sustained diurnal and nocturnal choruses have been observed. They float in shallow water in groups of five or more and call to females. The advertisement call does not travel far, which may be a reason for dense groups.

Breeding continues through spring and early summer, peaking in a 2-3 week period in late March and early April in New York. Eggs are laid in clusters.

Habitat
L. kauffeldi tends to inhabit large wetland areas, such as marshes, wet meadows, or slow-flowing water. Its habitat usually includes clear, shallow water. The species lives in or around open, vegetated spaces as well, with such plants as cattails, reeds, or river shrubs.

References

Lithobates

Amphibians of the United States
Endemic fauna of the United States
Amphibians described in 2014